Liliana Piera Marina Brescia Clerici, best known professionally as Liliana Ross, (March 30, 1939 – June 10, 2018) was an Italian-born Chilean actress, director, playwright, and theatrical producer whose professional career spanned more than fifty years. She was best known to television audiences for her starring roles in the Chilean telenovelas La Colorina (1977) and Machos (2003).

In 1992, Ross was honored with the title Knight of the Order of Merit of the Italian Republic by the Italian government.

Biography

Early life
Ross was born Liliana Piera Marina Brescia Clerici in Genoa, Italy. She was raised in Pegli, a neighborhood in Genoa.  Her first language was Italian. She emigrated to Chile with her parents when she was six-years old to escape World War II. She later recalled witnessing bombs falling on an Italian beach as her father ordered her to hide under a boat.

Career
In Chile, Ross appeared in more than twenty telenovelas and television dramas on four major networks – Canal 13, Televisión Nacional de Chile (TVN), Mega, and Chilevisión (CHV). In 1977, Ross was cast in the lead role on TVN telenovela, La Colorina, which aired for 88 episodes and launched her professional career.

Ross became best known to domestic and international television audiences for her starring role in the 2003 Canal 13 telenovela series, Machos. Ross portrayed Valentina Fernández, the matriarch of the Mercader family and mother of the seven Mercader brothers – Álex (Jorge Zabaleta), Ariel (Felipe Braun), Alonso (Cristián Campos), Antonio (Pablo Díaz), Adán (Gonzalo Valenzuela), Amaro (Diego Muñoz), and Armando. In contrast to her role on the show, Ross had three daughters and no sons in real life. In one of the show's most memorable scenes, Ross' character died surrounded by her on-screen husband, played by Héctor Noguera, and their sons. The episode, considered a landmark in Chilean television history, was watched by an entire generation of Chilean viewers.

Ross' last television credit was the 2012 telenovela series, La Sexóloga. In a July 2014 interview with Radio Cooperativa to promote her new comedic radio series, Sexitosas, Ross remarked that she would have loved to continue working in television, but she was no longer being offered roles in that particular medium. She told Radio Cooperativa at the time, "I've asked for a job, but I have no idea why they have stopped calling me." However, she continued to appear in several Chilean films throughout the 2010s, including Qué pena tu boda in 2011, Qué pena tu familia in 2012, and Mamá ya crecí in 2014.

Aside from television, much of Ross' work centered on the theater as an actor, director and producer. For example, Ross directed a 2000 Chilean stage adaptation of The Full Monty, which starred Gonzalo Valenzuela.

Honors and other work
In 2001, Ross teamed with her daughter, Daniela Miller, and photographer Pia Cosmelli to open a photography studio in Santiago called De Cuerpo y Alma (Body and Soul), which offered nude photography sessions to ordinary people. The premise of the project, which accepted clients of all shapes and sizes, was that "there are no ugly bodies," according to Ross.

Ross was honored by both the Chilean and Italian governments, as well as several publications, for her contributions to the arts. In 2003, the magazine Cara named honored Ross as its woman of the year. The Asociación de Periodistas de Espectáculos, Arte y Cultura de Chile awarded Ross, and nine other prominent actresses, with the Premio APES award in 2011.

Notably, the Italian government named Ross to the Order of Merit of the Italian Republic in 1992.

Later life
Ross began to suffer from cognitive difficulties in 2016 and 2017, which led to her retirement from acting. She was later diagnosed with Alzheimer's disease, though both she and her family kept the diagnosis a private matter.

Liliana Ross died at her home in Santiago, Chile, on June 10, 2018, at the age of 79. Her funeral was held at the Inmaculada Concepción de Vitacura.

Personal life
Ross met her first husband, director Hugo Miller, while both were students at Pontifical Catholic University of Chile. The couple in 1963 had three daughters – Daniela, Vanessa and Moira. Like Ross, two of her daughters, Vanessa Miller and Moira Miller, became professional actresses. Hugo Miller died in 1997.

In 2003, married her second husband, theater producer Raoul Pinno. They remained together until her death in 2018.

Filmography

Films

Telenovelas

Other television series and sitcoms

References

External links

1939 births
2018 deaths
Chilean film actresses
Chilean stage actresses
Chilean telenovela actresses
Chilean television actresses
Chilean theatre managers and producers
Knights of the Order of Merit of the Italian Republic
Italian emigrants to Chile
Pontifical Catholic University of Chile alumni
Actresses from Santiago
Deaths from dementia in Chile
Deaths from Alzheimer's disease